The 2019 Chatham Cup (known as the ISPS Handa Chatham Cup for sponsorship reasons) is New Zealand's 92nd annual knockout football competition.

The 2019 competition will have a preliminary round and four rounds proper before quarter-finals, semi-finals, and a final.

Results

Preliminary round
Matches were played on Saturday 20 April, Monday 22 April and Anzac Day, Thursday 25 April.

Northern Region

Central Region

Mainland Region

Southern Region

All teams listed below received byes to the first round.
Northern Region: Eastern Suburbs, Central United, North Shore United, Onehunga Sports, Western Springs, Birkenhead United, Melville United, East Coast Bays, Hamilton Wanderers, Manukau United, Glenfield Rovers, Waitakere City, Bay Olympic, Mt Albert-Ponsonby, Forrest Hill-Milford United, Three Kings United, Takapuna, Ellerslie, Bucklands Beach, Tauranga City, Waitemata, Waiheke United, Fencibles United, Hibiscus Coast, Claudelands Rovers, Manurewa, Uni-Mount Bohemian Celtic, Cambridge, Albany United, Franklin United, Greenhithe Catimba, Metro, Oratia United, Onehunga Mangere United, Navy, Papatoetoe, Papakura City
Central Region: Napier City Rovers, Napier Marist, North End, Palmerston North Marist, New Plymouth Rangers
Capital Region: Western Suburbs, Brooklyn Northern United, Wellington Marist, Waterside Karori, Island Bay United, Kapiti Coast United, Lower Hutt City, Miramar Rangers, Naenae, North Wellington, Otaki Purutaitama, Upper Hutt City, Petone, Seatoun, Stokes Valley, Stop Out, Tawa, Victoria University, Wainuiomata, Wairarapa United, Wellington Olympic, Wellington United
Mainland Region: Nelson Suburbs, Tahuna, Central SC, FC Nelson, Cashmere Technical, Western, Coastal Spirit, Ferrymead Bays, Selwyn United, Nomads United, FC Twenty 11, Halswell United, Burwood, Waimakiriri United
Southern Region: Mosgiel, Otago University, Queenstown, Wanaka, Roslyn Wakari, Green Island, Caversham, Dunedin Technical, Northern, Queen’s Park, Old Boys, Thistle (Timaru), Northern Hearts

Round 1
Round 1 matches took place between 10 and 12 May 2019.

Northern Region

Central / Capital Region

Mainland Region

Southern Region

All teams listed below received byes to the second round.
Northern Region: Glenfield Rovers, North Shore United, Manukau United, Melville United, Birkenhead United, Western Springs, East Coast Bays, Hamilton Wanderers, Onehunga Sports, Central United, Eastern Suburbs, Waitakere City
Capital Region: Lower Hutt City, North Wellington, Western Suburbs, Waterside Karori

Round 2
All matches were be played on Queen's Birthday weekend 31 May-3 June 2019.
Northern Region

Capital / Central Region

Mainland Region

Southern Region

*The match between Mosgiel and West End was originally an on-field 5–0 win for Mosgiel but they were deemed to have fielded an ineligible player and the result was overturn to a 3–0 loss instead. West End progressed to round three.

Round 3
All matches were played on the weekend of 15–16 June 2019.

Northern Region

Central / Capital Region

Mainland

Southern Region

Round 4
All matches were played on the weekend of 6–7 July 2019.

Northern Region

Capital / Central Region

Mainland / Southern Region

Quarter-finals
The quarter-finals were played on the weekend of 3–4 August 2019.

Semi-finals
The semi-finals were played on the weekend of 24–25 August 2019.

Final
The final was played on 8 September 2019.

References

External links
Chatham Cup section on the New Zealand Football website 

Chatham Cup
Chatham Cup
Chatham Cup
New Zealand, Chatham Cup
New Zealand, Chatham Cup
September 2019 sports events in New Zealand